Nicholas A. Valentino is an American political scientist. He currently serves as a principal investigator of the American National Election Studies (ANES).

Valentino earned a bachelor's degree from Brown University and completed his doctorate at the University of California, Los Angeles. He began teaching at the University of Michigan in 1997. He left Michigan for an appointment as Mike Hogg Professor of Community Affairs at the University of Texas at Austin in 2007. He returned to the University of Michigan faculty in 2009.

Valentino is Professor of Political Science and Research Professor in the Institute for Social Research at the University of Michigan. He served as president of the International Society of Political Psychology from 2019-2020. Valentino specializes in political psychological approaches to understanding public opinion formation, socialization, information seeking and electoral participation. His work employs experimental methods, surveys, and content analyses of political communication. The research has focused on the intersecting roles of racial attitudes and emotional dynamics, and has been published in the American Political Science Review, the American Journal of Political Science, The Journal of Politics, Political Psychology, and Public Opinion Quarterly. Valentino is currently exploring the changing nature of racial rhetoric in America and around the world, and the ways empathy for outgroups can blunt dangerous overreactions to threats from globalization and multiculturalism.

With Alex Mintz and Carly Wayne, Valentino is a co-author of Beyond Rationality: Behavioral Political Science in the 21st Century (Cambridge University Press 2021). He is the co-author of Seeing Us in Them: Social Divisions and the Politics of Group Empathy with Cigdem V. Sirin, and José D. Villalobos (Cambridge University Press 2021). Seeing Us in Them examines outgroup empathy as a powerful predisposition in politics that pushes individuals to see past social divisions and work together in complex, multicultural societies. It also reveals racial/ethnic intergroup differences in this predisposition, rooted in early patterns of socialization and collective memory. The book won the APSA Best Book Award (2022), the David Sears Best Book in Political Psychology (2022), the Robert Lane Award (2022), and the Best Book in Experimental Political Science Award (APSA, 2022). 

David O. Sears was Valentino's mentor at UCLA, and Shanto Iyengar was a dissertation co-chair.  

Valentino has served as chair or co-chair on the dissertation committees of: Hilary Izatt, Sara Morell, Anil Menon, Kirill Zhirkov, Marzia Oceno, James Newburg, Erin Cikanek, Princess Williams, Julia Kamin, Fabian Neuner, Timothy Ryan, Ismail White, Eric Groenendyk, Antoine Banks, Yanna Krupnikov, Patrick O’Mahen; Katie Brown, Debra Melican, Krysha Gregorowicz, Rossie Hutchinson, Christine Brittle, Thomas Buhr, and Matthew Vandenbroek.

References

Living people
Year of birth missing (living people)
American political scientists
University of Michigan faculty
University of Texas at Austin faculty
Brown University alumni
University of California, Los Angeles alumni

External links 
  at the University of Michigan